Magnolia is a genus of flowering plants.

Magnolia or The Magnolia may also refer to:

Places

Australia
 Magnolia, Queensland, a locality in the Fraser Coast Region, Queensland, Australia

United States
 Magnolia, Alabama, an unincorporated community
 Magnolia, Arkansas, a city
 Magnolia, former name of Inyokern, California
 Magnolia, Delaware, a town
 Magnolia, Florida, a former town
 Magnolia, Georgia, an unincorporated community
 Magnolia, Illinois, a village
 Magnolia, Indiana, an unincorporated community
 Magnolia, Iowa, a city in Harrison County
 Magnolia, Livingston Parish, Louisiana, an unincorporated community
 Magnolia, Massachusetts, a village in the city of Gloucester
 Magnolia, Minnesota, a town in Rock County
 Magnolia, Mississippi, a city
 Magnolia, Missouri, an unincorporated community
 Magnolia, New Jersey, a borough
 Magnolia, North Carolina, a town
 Magnolia, Ohio, a village
 Magnolia, Texas, a city in Montgomery County
 Magnolia, Seattle, Washington, a neighborhood
 Magnolia Bridge, a bridge connecting the Seattle, Washington neighborhoods of Magnolia and Interbay
 Magnolia, West Virginia, an unincorporated community
 Magnolia, Wisconsin, a town
 Magnolia (community), Wisconsin, an unincorporated community in the town
 Magnolia Township (disambiguation)

Space
 1060 Magnolia, asteroid

Houses and plantations in the United States
 Magnolia Plantation (disambiguation)
 Magnolia (Bennettsville, South Carolina), a private residence
 Magnolia (Gadsden, South Carolina), a plantation house
 Canty House, also known as "The Magnolia", a historic house on the campus of West Virginia State University

People
Anne Hartkamp (born 1964), German jazz singer who has often gone under the pseudonym of "Magnolia"
 Magnolia Antonino (1915–2010), a Senator of the Philippines
 Magnolia Crawford, American drag queen
 Magnolia Thunderpussy (1939–1996), born Patricia Donna Mallon, San Francisco burlesque performer, radio personality, filmmaker and restaurateur

Arts and entertainment

Music

Albums
 Magnolia (The Pineapple Thief album) or the title song, 2014
 Magnolia (Randy Houser album), 2019
 Magnolia (Turnover album), 2013
 Magnolia (score), from the 1999 film, composed by Jon Brion, 2000
 Magnolia (soundtrack), from the 1999 film, by Aimee Mann and others, 1999
 Magnolia (EP), by Ellie Holcomb, or the title song, 2011
 Magnólia, by Lúcia Moniz, 1999

Songs
 "Magnolia" (song), by Playboi Carti, 2017
 "Magnolia" (Gang of Youths song), 2015
 "Magnolia", by J. J. Cale from Naturally, 1972
 "Magnolia", by Lil Wayne from In Tune We Trust, 2017
 "Magnolia", by Big Red Machine from How Long Do You Think It's Gonna Last?, 2021

Other arts and entertainment
 Magnolia (film), a 1999 film by Paul Thomas Anderson
 Magnolia (soundtrack)
 Magnolia Pictures, an American film distributor
 Magnolia Network, formerly the DIY Network and now focusing on documentary-style reality series related to home repair and renovation
 Magnolia Breeland, a fictional character on the TV series Hart of Dixie
 Professor Magnolia, a fictional character from the video game Pokémon Sword and Shield

Brands and enterprises
 Magnolia (Philippine company), a wholly owned subsidiary of Philippine company San Miguel Corporation
 Magnolia (brand), a food and beverage brand of the company
 Magnolia (Fraser and Neave brand), a dairy brand of Singapore company Fraser and Neave
 Magnolia (oil platform) in the Gulf of Mexico
 Magnolia Bakery, chain of bakeries founded in New York City
 Magnolia Home Theater (brand), the home theater electronics section owned and operated by Best Buy
 Magnolia Hotel (disambiguation)
 Magnolia Petroleum Company, an oil company later a part of Mobil

Computing and technology
 Magnolia (CMS), an open source, Java-based, digital business platform with a content management system (CMS) at its core
 Ma.gnolia, social bookmarking website

Flora and fauna
 Magnolia, cultivar of muscadine
 Magnolia grandiflora (Brooklyn), a tree that has been designated a New York City landmark
 Magnolia warbler, a bird species
 Schisandra chinensis, a plant whose fruit is called magnolia berry

Ships
 Magnolia (steamboat), wooden-hulled steamship that operated on Puget Sound from 1907 to 1937
 , a US Navy ship later renamed Magnolia

Other uses
 Magnolia High School (disambiguation)
 Magnolia Projects, officially the C.J. Peete Projects, also known as "The Magnolia", previous Housing Project in New Orleans
 Magnolia (color), an off-white color
 Magnolia (given name)

See also
 Magnolia Cemetery (disambiguation), a number of cemeteries
 Magnolia Grove (disambiguation)
 Magnolia Hall (disambiguation), a number of locations
 Magnolia Manor (disambiguation), a number of listed buildings 
 Magnolia Park (disambiguation)
 The Magnolias (disambiguation)